Mesoglossus caraibicus is a species of acorn worm in the family Harrimaniidae, which can be found on Bahamas, Greater Antilles, Southern Caribbean, and Gulf of Mexico.

References

Enteropneusta
Animals described in 1924